{{Infobox television
| alt_name             = Canada's Smartest Person Junior (season 4)'
| image                =
| image_alt            = 
| caption              = 
| genre                = Competition
| creator              = Robert Cohen
| based_on             = 
| developer            = 
| writer               = 
| director             = 
| creative_director    = 
| presenter            = 
| starring             = 
| judges               = 
| voices               = 
| narrated             = 
| theme_music_composer = 
| opentheme            = 
| endtheme             = 
| composer             = 
| country              = Canada
| language             = English
| num_seasons          = 4 (+1 special)
| num_episodes         = 30
| list_episodes        = 
| executive_producer   = Robert Cohen
| producer             = 
| editor               = 
| cinematography       = 
| camera               = 
| runtime              = 
| company              = Media Headquarters
| distributor          = 
| network              = CBC Television
| picture_format       = 
| audio_format         = 
| first_aired          = 
| last_aired           = present
| related              =  
}}Canada's Smartest Person is a Canadian reality television competition series. Contestants compete in a series of different challenges based on American psychologist Howard Gardner's theory of multiple intelligences to earn the title of "Canada's Smartest Person." The first three seasons of the series were hosted by television personality Jessi Cruickshank, and the fourth by actor Paul Sun-Hyung Lee. Actor Jeff Douglas co-hosted the first season in 2014 with Cruickshank.

The show is produced by Media Headquarters and broadcast nationally on CBC Television. The first version of the show aired in 2012 as a 2-hour special. The series was picked up and the first full season aired on CBC as a 9-part series in 2014. It was the number one new Canadian series of the fall season, with almost one in four Canadians tuning in. In 2016, it was the only original Canadian format to be nominated for the Academy of Canadian Cinema & Television's Golden Screen Award for highest rated reality series. The second season began airing on October 4, 2015. On March 31st, 2016 CBC announced the series would return for a third season as part of their fall/winter schedule. The fourth season, a spin off known as Canada's Smartest Person Junior, began airing on November 14, 2018. Canada's Smartest Person has one of the highest percentages of family and co-viewing ever on CBC.

During the broadcast, viewers participate in all of the challenges from home in real-time using a smartphone app. The play-along app has been an industry-leading success. The first season of the series saw over 175,000 downloads of the app and nearly one million individual intelligence tests taken across the country. As of 2017 there have been over 300,000 downloads of the app, making it one of the most successful peer to peer gaming applications in Canada.

Format

Every week four Canadians compete in front of a studio audience. They are given a set of five challenges designed to test their abilities in one or more of the following intelligence categories: musical, physical, social, logical, visual and linguistic. There was always one challenge that combined two categories together.

In the series finale, eight finalists compete to earn the title of Canada's Smartest Person.

The 2014 series opened with a one-hour documentary that explored the Theory of Multiple Intelligence.

The format is being exploited internationally by multi-media studio Electus. Electus has licensed Canada's Smartest Person to Turkey's TRT and Sera Film for production, and has secured deals in France, Norway, Sweden and Portugal

Season overview

Participants

Season 1

Episode 101 - September 28, 2014

Episode 102 - October 5, 2014

Episode 103 - October 12, 2014

Episode 104 - October 19, 2014

Episode 105 - October 26, 2014

Episode 106 - November 2, 2014

Episode 107 - November 9, 2014

Episode 108 - November 16, 2014

Episode 109 - November 23, 2014
In the season finale, the winners from each episode competed in a series of competitions for the title of "Canada's Smartest Person".

Season 2

Episode 201 - October 4th, 2015

Episode 202 - October 11th, 2015

Episode 203 - October 18th, 2015

Episode 204 - October 25th, 2015

Episode 205 - November 1st, 2015

Episode 206 - November 8th, 2015

Episode 207 - November 15th, 2015

Episode 208 - November 22nd, 2015
In the season finale, the winners from each episode competed in a series of competitions for the title of "Canada's Smartest Person". The seven Gauntlet winners from the previous episodes were joined by a wildcard, determined by the Gauntlet loser who had accumulated the most points in their episode.

Season 3
Episode 301 - November 13, 2016

Episode 302 - November 20, 2016

Episode 303 - November 27, 2016

Episode 304 - December 4, 2016

Episode 305 - December 11, 2016

Episode 306 - December 18, 2016

Season 4
The fourth season of Canada's Smartest Person (officially entitled Canada's Smartest Person Junior) premiered on November 14, 2018. As the official title implies, the contestants are all preadolescent. Paul Sun-Hyung Lee hosted this season.

Unlike the previous three seasons which followed a knockout format, this season followed a traditional competitive reality television series format.

Each of the first three episodes began with a Speed Round, which consists of six small challenges in a rapid-fire succession. After the challenge, the lowest-scoring contestant was eliminated from the competition automatically and the highest-scoring contestant was deemed safe from elimination. Then, the remaining contestants were paired based on their rankings in the Speed Round (2nd place with 3rd place, 4th place with 5th place, etc.) and competed in a team challenge. After the challenge, all but the bottom two pairings were deemed safe from elimination. Afterwards, the remaining four contestants competed in a head-to-head challenge and the top two performers were deemed safe after the challenge. Finally, the remaining two contestants competed in the Ultimate Elimination round, which consists of various sudden-death challenges that two contestants compete head-to-head in. Once a contestant won three rounds, that contestant was deemed safe and the other was eliminated from the competition.

The fourth episode also began with a Speed Round, but unlike the first three episodes, the highest-scoring contestant was not deemed safe from elimination after the challenge. Then, the remaining contestants competed in a head-to-head challenge instead of a team challenge. After the challenge, only the highest-scoring contestant was deemed safe from elimination. The latter two challenges of the episode proceeded the same way that the latter two challenges of the first three did.

The fifth episode was a Redemption episode in which the first eight eliminated contestants were given a chance to return to the competition and qualify for the finale as a result. Like usual, the episode began with a Speed Round, but, after the challenge, the two lowest-scoring contestants were eliminated from the Redemption episode automatically and the highest-scoring contestant still had to compete in further challenges with the rest. Then, the remaining six contestants competed in a head-to-head challenge that, afterwards, would eliminate the two lowest-scoring contestants from the Redemption episode. Then, the remaining four contestants competed in a head-to-head challenge that, afterwards, would eliminate the lowest-scoring contestant from the Redemption episode and would return the highest-scoring contestant back into the competition. Finally, the remaining two contestants competed in the Ultimate Elimination round. The winner of the face-off returned to the competition and the other was eliminated from the Redemption episode.

The sixth and final episode consisted of five head-to-head challenges in which, after each one, the lowest-scoring contestant would be eliminated from the competition. The last of these challenges was the Super Gauntlet, a Canada's Smartest Person classic, which resulted in Mateus Soto being declared the winner of Canada's Smartest Person Junior''.

  This contestant won the competition.
  This contestant finished in second place.
  This contestant finished first in the challenge and became safe from elimination for the episode.
  This contestant performed well enough in the challenge to be safe from elimination for the episode.
  This contestant was neither safe from elimination nor eliminated after their performance in the challenge.
  This contestant did not compete in the challenge because they were already safe from elimination.
  This contestant was eliminated from the competition at the end of the challenge.
  This contestant has already been eliminated from the competition.
  This contestant did not participate in the Redemption episode because they had already qualified for the finale.
 This contestant was neither safe from elimination nor eliminated from the Redemption episode after their performance in the challenge.
  This contestant returned to the competition after the Redemption episode and qualified for the finale as a result.
  This contestant did not compete in the challenge because they had already qualified to return to the competition at a prior point in the Redemption episode.
  This contestant was eliminated from the Redemption episode and failed to return to the competition as a result.
 Denotes a challenge that is based on linguistic intelligence.
 Denotes a challenge that is based on physical intelligence.
  Denotes a challenge that is based on musical intelligence.
  Denotes a challenge that is based on visual intelligence.
  Denotes a challenge that is based on social intelligence.
  Denotes a challenge that is based on logical intelligence.

References

CBC Television original programming
2010s Canadian reality television series
2014 Canadian television series debuts
Television shows filmed in Toronto
English-language television shows